A safety syringe is a syringe with a built-in safety mechanism to reduce the risk of needlestick injuries to healthcare workers and others. The needle on a safety syringe can be detachable or permanently attached. On some models, a sheath is placed over the needle, whereas in others the needle retracts into the barrel. Safety needles serve the same functions as safety syringes, but the protective mechanism is a part of the needle rather than the syringe. Legislation requiring safety syringes or equivalents has been introduced in many nations since needlestick injuries and re-use prevention became the focus of governments and safety bodies.

Types
There are many types of safety syringes available on the market.  Auto Disable (AD) syringes are designed as a single use syringe, with an internal mechanism blocking the barrel once depressed so it cannot be depressed again.  The other type of syringe with a re-use prevention feature is the breaking plunger syringe.  An internal mechanism cracks the syringe when the plunger is fully depressed to prevent further use.  These syringes are only effectively disabled with a full depression of the plunger; users can avoid activating the re-use prevention feature and re-use the syringe.

The more effective safety syringes have reuse and needlestick prevention features.  A sheath or hood slides over the needle after the injection is completed with a Needlestick Prevention Syringe, which also has a re-use prevention feature (either an auto disable mechanism or breaking plunger).  Retractable syringes use either manual or spring-loaded retraction to withdraw the needle into the barrel of the syringe.  Some brands of spring-loaded syringes can have a splatter effect, where blood and fluids are sprayed off the cannula from the force of the retraction.  Manual retraction syringes are generally easier to depress because there is no resistance from a spring.

Alternatives
Traditional glass syringes can be re-used once disinfected.  Plastic body syringes have become more popular in recent years because they are disposable.  Unfortunately, improper disposal methods and re-use are responsible for transferring blood borne diseases.

Importance
Of the 55 cases documented by the CDC of (non-sex work) occupational transmission of HIV, 90% were from contaminated needles that pierced the skin.  The direct cost of needlestick injuries was calculated in a recent study to be between $539 and $672 million US dollars.  That includes only lab tests, treatment, service and "other"; it does not take into account lost time and wages for employers and individuals.

Legislation

United States
Needlestick Safety and Prevention Act, effective date 2001

Two lawyers, Mike Weiss and Paul Danzinger, were approached in 1998 by an inventor, Thomas Shaw, who was having trouble selling a safety syringe developed to protect health care workers from accidentally being infected by dirty needles. The problems were due to monopolistic actions of a major industry needle maker and hospital group purchasing organizations.  The case was settled before trial for $150 million. This was portrayed by the 2011 movie Puncture. Shaw's attempts to get his retractable needle accepted by health care facilities were covered in a 2010 Washington Monthly article.

Canada
Health Canada Laboratory Biosafety Guidelines
Provincial Legislation:
British Columbia
Alberta
Manitoba
Saskatchewan
Ontario
Nova Scotia

Australia
No nationwide legislation is in place, but suggested practices or policies have been implemented in New South Wales, Victoria, and Queensland.

Africa
The Nigerian government issued an October 1, 2012 deadline for phasing out of conventional syringes and usage of auto-disable syringes in its health institutions.

Europe
The European Union has some regulations on this subject.

See also
Infection control
Peggy Ferro

References

External links
 W.H.O. Injection Safety Toolbox
 W.H.O. Injection Safety
 Centers for Disease Control – Injection Safety
• Washington Monthly, Jul/Aug 2010,  "Dirty Medicine"

Medical equipment
Drug delivery devices